Sir Henry Willoughby (1451 – 11 May 1528) was a Knight of the Body to Kings Henry VII and Henry VIII and MGO.

Origins
He was born in 1451 in Wollaton (Nottinghamshire), the eldest son of Robert Willoughby by his wife Margaret Griffith. His mother married Peter Leigh of Nottingham after his father's death. Robert inherited the Wollaton and Middleton estates from his half brother Richard in 1471. It took a further two decades for him to take full possession, since his mother Margaret Leigh had an interest in Wollaton, while his grandmother Margaret Bingham spent her life in the Middleton estate, the Dunsby and Wigtoft estates in Lincolnshire, and the manors of Gunthorpe and Lowdham in Nottinghamshire.

At the origin of the Willoughby (Willuby) surname there is record of the Bugge family. They were either the original inhabitants of the town of Wollaton, or settled in it about the time of King John, rising to considerable eminence. From them sprung the Willoughbies of Wollaton.

Radulphus Bugge was an ancestor of diverse good families as observed in Willoughby-on-the-Wolds. He was a wealthy merchant and purchased the lands in 1240–41. Probably buried at St.Peter's church (Nottingham). He had two sons, Richard and Radulphus, the latter having been the father of Richard de Bingham. Richard's son, Richard de Willoughby was Knighted by King Edward II in 1325, and increased their patrimony exceedingly as a very rich lawyer.

Richard's son was Richard de Willoughby, a Justice of the Common Pleas for 28 years in the days of Edward III, who also appears to have had a few higher appointments in his career.
From his second wife, Joana (Matilda) he had a son, Sir Edmund Willoughby, who inherited the bulk of the property. In the second subsequent generation Sir Hugh married Margaret Freville and started a Barony named after the estates.

Sir Henry was their grandson and a distinguished man in his day.

Career

He was a servant of the royal household under Richard III, and a Knight of the Body to both Kings Henry VII and Henry VIII.

At the beginning of his reiving and cavalry days, Henry and his brother Richard were remained and tried for the abduction of Jane Statham. This happened after the latter become widowed at the outcome of the battle of Bosworth in 1485. The heiress of the House of York was also forcibly married to Richard and taken from her family. As a consequence, the Willoughbys had to pay large sums in compensation to the victim and affected family members, the marriage having also been annulled. The incident seems to have hardly affected their prosperity.

He was later knighted at the battle of Stoke by Henry VII in June 1487, and served in Flanders in 1489. Sir Henry maintained a retinue on behalf of the King, and campaigned in Brittany in 1491. He also defended Blackheath in 1497 during the Cornish rebellion. He was Master-General of the Ordnance to Henry VIII in 1512 and raised a retinue of more than 800 men to campaign in Spain, during the conquest of Iberian Navarre. He also fought at the Battle of the Spurs in 1513. He attended to Queen Catherine of Aragon at the Field of the Cloth of Gold summit in 1520.

He had much influence in the Midlands thanks to his great wealth, based mostly on coal from the Wollaton pits, which he exploited with fresh vigour. He became a Justice of the peace in Nottinghamshire from 1492 for the remainder of his life. He held the same position in Lincolnshire and Warwickshire, and served as Sheriff for all three counties.

He was buried in St Leonard's Church, Wollaton where he rests today in his canopied tomb, with effigies to all his wives.

Family
He married firstly Margaret c.1470, daughter of Sir Robert Markham (d. 1490). They had the following children:
 Sir John (died 1549), married Anne, daughter of Edward Grey, 1st Viscount Lisle in 1486
 Edward (d. 1541), married Anne, daughter of Sir William Filliol in 1518–19, and had:
 Henry (d. 1549) married Anne Grey (d.1548), daughter of Thomas Grey, 2nd Marquess of Dorset, and had:
 Thomas (d.1559)
 Francis (1547 – 1596) 
 Margaret, who married Sir Matthew Arundell (c. 1533 – 1598) of Wardour Castle.
 Jane, who married the grandson of Ralph Percy, Sir Guiscard Harbottle of Beamish (d. Battle of Flodden). They had:
 Eleanor (died 1567), married Sir Thomas Percy (c. 1504 – 1537)
 Mary (c. 1507 – 1556)
 George Harbottle Esq. (c. 1516 – c. 1538)
 Dorothy (died c. 1507), married Sir Anthony Fitzherbert of Norbury in 1507
 Margaret, married Sir John Zouche of Codnor in 1496, and had:
 George Zouche, of Codnor (c.1498 – 1557)
 Richard, William, Henry, Mary and Elizabeth Zouche
Secondly in 1491, he married Lady Elizabeth (died 1507), daughter of Thomas Burgh of Gainsborough, and widow of Richard Fitzhugh, Baron FitzHugh.

Henry married Ellen thirdly by 1512, daughter of John Egerton of Wrinehill, Staffordshire. They had:

 Sir Hugh (d. 1553) "the Navigator", married Jane Strelley
 Alice, married Richard Draycott (died 1544) in 1523, they had:
 Henry, Edmund, George, Philip, Anne and Mary Draycott

Lastly, he married Alice Walleys or Walters.

Ancestry

Notes

References 

1451 births
1528 deaths
Esquires of the Body
15th-century English people
15th-century soldiers
16th-century English soldiers
English justices of the peace
English Protestants
Henry
People from Wollaton